Known internationally as the MVD, The Ministry of Internal Affairs of The Russian Federation encompasses all militia (police) forces, Interior Troops and the State Migration Service.  It has its own ministerial awards system subordinate to state awards.  This article will endeavour to give as complete a picture as possible on the awards of this Russian ministry.

Ministry of Internal Affairs

Medals

Decorations

Abrogated medals

Abrogated decorations

Commemorative, veteran & public awards

Regional & departmental awards

Federal Migration Service

Emblems of the Ministry of Internal Affairs

See also
MVD
Internal Troops
Internal Troops (Russia)
Awards and Emblems of the Ministry of Defense of the Russian Federation
Awards of the Ministry for Emergency Situations of Russia
Awards of the Federal Security Service of the Russian Federation
Awards of the Federal Protective Service of the Russian Federation
Awards and decorations of the Russian Federation
Ministerial awards of the Russian Federation
Honorary titles of the Russian Federation
Awards and decorations of the Soviet Union

References

External links 
 The Ministry of Internal Affairs of Russia In Russian
  In Russian
 The Federal Immigration Service of Russia In Russian

Other sources
Russian Legal Library - Decrees and Regulations Consultant Plus In Russian

Internet Portal Russian Symbols In Russian

Orders, decorations, and medals of Russia
Russian awards
Military awards and decorations of Russia
Law enforcement agencies of Russia